The 2021–22 season is the 4th season in the existence of Juventus U23 and the club's 4th consecutive season in the Serie C, the third level of Italian football. In addition to the domestic league, Juventus U23 also played this season's edition of the Coppa Italia Serie C.

Pre-season and friendlies 
On 7 August 2021, Juventus U23 played a friendly against Pro Vercelli, winning 4–0. On 13 August, Juventus played a friendly Como. In the 4th minute Matías Soulé scored the opening goal giving Juventus U23 the lead. 11 minutes later, Belgianmen Moutir Chajia scored the equalizing goal. On 19 August, Juventus U23 played a friendly against their first team Juventus losing 3–0.

Serie C

Overview 
Juventus U23 began their league on 29 August 2021 against Pergolettese.

Coppa Italia Serie C 

Juventus U23 started the competition as defending champions having won the cup in the 2019–20 season winning 3–2 against Pro Sesto. Juventus U23 were able to come back from the two goals' disadvantage scored by Daniele Grandi in the first minute with a diagonal shoot and by Federico Marchesi in the 16th minute with a header from a corner kick. In the 34th minute Alessandro Sersanti scored the 1–2 goal thus reducing the disadvantage and six minutes later Nicolò Cudrig levelled the result. In the 108th minute, in the extra-time, Fabio Miretti gave the lead to Juventus U23 through a penalty kick.

Serie C play-offs

Third round

Quarter-finals

Transfers

Summer

In

Out

Player statistics 

|-
! colspan=14 style=background:#DCDCDC; text-align:center| Goalkeepers

|-
! colspan=14 style=background:#DCDCDC; text-align:center| Defenders

|-
! colspan=14 style=background:#DCDCDC; text-align:center| Midfielders

|-
! colspan=14 style=background:#DCDCDC; text-align:center| Forwards

|}

See also 
2021–22 Juventus F.C. season
2021–22 Juventus F.C. (women) season

Notes

References 

Juventus Next Gen seasons
Juventus U23